The 1936 Maryland Terrapins football team was an American football team that represented the University of Maryland in the Southern Conference (SoCon) during the 1936 college football season. In their first season under head coach Frank Dobson, the Terrapins compiled a 6–5 record (4–2 against SoCon opponents), finished in a tie for fifth place in the SoCon, and outscored their opponents by a total of 117 to 59.

Schedule

References

Maryland
Maryland Terrapins football seasons
Maryland Terrapins football